Statistics of Campeonato da 1ª Divisão do Futebol in the 2003 season.

Overview
Monte Carlo won the championship.

References
RSSSF

Campeonato da 1ª Divisão do Futebol seasons
Macau
Macau
1